Robin des Bois (full title Robin des Bois: Ne renoncez jamais) is a French musical with mise en scène by Michel Laprise and text and music by Patrice Guirao and Lionel Florence. It premiered on 26 September 2013 at Palais des congrès de Paris and played until 5 January 2014 with French singer M. Pokora in the role of Robin Hood.

Synopsis
In this amended version of Robin Hood, Robin and Marianne (in English Maid Marian) have decided to end their relationship. Fifteen years later, they both are leaders of their own groups, in two separated parts of the country. Marianne lives with Adrien, the boy she had with Robin, but Robin doesn't know about him. After another attack from the sheriff's army, Marianne requests Robin's help to save her group and their houses. Adrien, though, now 15, falls in love with the daughter of Shérif de Nottingham (in English Sheriff of Nottingham, the avowed enemy of Robin). When the sheriff realises that Adrien is Robin's son, he decides to imprison the young boy, despite the feelings his daughter has toward him. Robin launches a rescue operation with the help of his followers and notably Petit Jean (Little John) and Frère Tuck (Friar Tuck) played by Nyco Lilliu.

Personnel

Presentation
Gilbert Coullier
Roberto Ciurleo
RDB-P
Mise en scène
Michel Laprise
Production
Gilbert Coullier Productions
Composition
David Hallyday
Fred Château
Mathieu Mendès
Corneille
Shaka Ponk
Coyle Girelli
Stanislas
John Mamann

Costumes
Stéphane Rolland
Cast
(Roles as in French production)
M. Pokora as Robin des Bois (Robin Hood)
Stéphanie Bédard as Marianne
Nyco Lilliu as Frère Tuck (Friar Tuck)
Caroline Costa as Bédélia
Marc Antoine as Petit Jean (Little John)
Dumè as Vaisey, le shérif de Nottingham (Sheriff of Nottingham)
Sacha Tran as Adrien

Soundtrack

Robin des Bois soundtrack (longer title Robin des Bois - Ne Renoncez Jamais) for the musical Robin des Bois was released on Capitol Records / EMI on 22 March 2013 and entered the SNEP official French Albums Chart in its first week of release.

The album is being released in two versions. The standard edition and the digipack limited edition.

Track list
M. Pokora – "Le jour qui se rêve" (3:45)
Dumè & M. Pokora – "Devenir quelqu'un" (3:40)
Stéphanie Bédard & M. Pokora – "Tes blessures" (4:43)
Nyco Lilliu, Marc Antoine & M. Pokora – "À nous" (3:59)
Caroline Costa – "J'ai dit oui" (3:59)
Nyco Lilliu – "Un monde à changer" (3:25)
M. Pokora – "Si l'amour existe" (3:50)
Stéphanie Bédard – "La flèche ou la cible" (3:45)
Sacha Tran – "Quinze ans à peine" (3:50)
Marc Antoine – "Lui sait qui je suis" (3:58)
Caroline Costa & Sacha Tran – "Laissez-nous vivre" (3:33)
Dumè – "Notting Hill Nottingham" (3:11)
Caroline Costa & Sacha Tran – "Terre" (4:03)

Charts

Weekly charts

Year-end charts

Singles
In September 2012, an initial single was launched titled "Un monde à changer" by Nyco Lilliu accompanied by a music video. 
In February 2013, a second single from the show was released titled "Le jour qui se rêve".

References

External links
 Official site

2013 musicals
Depictions of Robin Hood in music
French musicals